Matti Markkanen (14 May 1887 – 4 February 1942) was a Finnish gymnast who won bronze in the 1908 Summer Olympics.

Gymnastics 

He won the Finnish national championship in team gymnastics as a member of Ylioppilasvoimistelijat in 1909.

Biography 

His parents were ambulatory school teacher Matti Markkanen and Katrina Kristina Voutilainen. He married Aili Nygrén in 1915.

He was ordained as a priest in 1910. He served as a chaplain in Uukuniemi, Pielavesi and Lappee in 1913–1928, and as a vicar in Vieremä from 1928.

References 

1887 births
1942 deaths
Finnish male artistic gymnasts
Gymnasts at the 1908 Summer Olympics
Olympic gymnasts of Finland
Olympic bronze medalists for Finland
Olympic medalists in gymnastics

Medalists at the 1908 Summer Olympics
People from Kuopio Province (Grand Duchy of Finland)